Fowler House may refer to:

in the United States (by state then city)
Oak Place (Huntsville, Alabama), listed on the National Register of Historic Places (NRHP) as the Steele-Fowler House, in Madison County
Absalom Fowler House, Little Rock, Arkansas, NRHP-listed
Fowler Family Farm, Cumming, Georgia, listed on the NRHP in Forsyth County
Fowler Apartments, Milledgeville, Georgia, listed on the NRHP in Baldwin County
Solomon Fowler Mansion, Bristol, Indiana, listed on the NRHP in Elkhart County
Moses Fowler House, Lafayette, Indiana, listed on the NRHP in Tippecanoe County
Fowler Swimming Pool and Bathhouse, Fowler, Kansas, listed on the NRHP in Meade County
Clark C. Fowler House, Tompkinsville, Kentucky, listed on the NRHP in Monroe County
Benjamin Piatt Fowler House, Union, Kentucky, listed on the NRHP in Boone County
Jeremiah Fowler House, Lubec, Maine, listed on the NRHP in Washington County
 Fowler House (Danvers, Massachusetts), listed on the NRHP in Essex County
Rea Putnam Fowler House, Danvers, Massachusetts, listed on the NRHP in Essex County
Henry T. Fowler House, Kansas City, Missouri, listed on the NRHP in Jackson County
Charles N. Fowler House, Elizabeth, New Jersey, listed on the NRHP in Union County
Fowler-Loomis House, Mexico, New York, listed on the NRHP in Oswego County
William Dixon Fowler House, Pauline, South Carolina, listed on the NRHP in Spartanburg County
C.E. and Bertha Fowler House, Watertown, South Dakota, listed on the NRHP in Codington County
William J. Fowler Mill and House, Eve Mills, Tennessee, listed on the NRHP in Monroe County
Edwards-Fowler House, Lake City, Tennessee, listed on the NRHP in Anderson County
Fowler House (Bastrop, Texas), listed on the NRHP in Bastrop County
Fowler-Jenkins House, Bastrop, Texas, listed on the NRHP in Bastrop County
D. D. Fowler House, Georgetown, Texas, listed on the NRHP in Williamson County
Botts-Fowler House, Mansfield, Texas, listed on the NRHP in Tarrant County
Fowler House (Salado, Texas), listed on the NRHP in Bell County
Fowler-Steele House, Windsor, Vermont, listed on the NRHP in Windsor County
Capt. Enoch S. Fowler House, Port Townsend, Washington, listed on the NRHP in Jefferson County